The Únětice culture or Aunjetitz culture is an archaeological culture at the start of the Central European Bronze Age, dated roughly to about 2300–1600BC. The eponymous site for this culture, the village of Únětice, is located in the central Czech Republic, northwest of Prague. There are about 1,400 documented Únětice culture sites in the Czech Republic and Slovakia, 550 sites in Poland, and, in Germany, about 500 sites and loose finds locations. The Únětice culture is also known from north-eastern Austria (in association with the so-called Böheimkirchen group), and from western Ukraine.

History of research

The Aunjetitzer/Únětice culture is named after a discovery by Czech surgeon and amateur archaeologist Čeněk Rýzner (1845–1923), who in 1879 found a cemetery in Bohemia of over 50 inhumations on Holý Vrch, the hill overlooking the village of Únětice. At about the same time, the first Úněticean burial ground was unearthed in Southern Moravia in Měnín by A.Rzehak. Following these initial discoveries and until the 1930s, many more sites, primarily cemeteries, were identified, including Němčice nad Hanou (1926), sites in vicinity of Prague, Polepy (1926–1927), and Šardičky (1927).
 
In Germany, a Princely Grave in Leubingen had already been excavated in 1877 by F.Klopfleisch; however, he incorrectly dated the monument to the Hallstatt during the Iron Age. In subsequent years, a main cluster of Úněticean sites in Central Germany were identified at Baalberge, Helmsdorf, Nienstedt, Körner, Leubingen, Halberstadt, Klein Quenstedt, Wernigerode, Blankenburg, and Quedlinburg. At the same time, Adlerberg and Straubing groups were defined in 1918 by Schumacher.

In Silesia, the first archaeologist associated with the discovery and identification of the Únětice culture was Hans Seger (1864–1943). Seger not only discovered several Úněticean sites and supervised pioneering excavations in locations in Silesia, now in Poland as Przecławice, but he also linked Bohemian European Bronze Age (EBA) materials with similar assemblages in Lower Silesia. In Greater Poland, the first excavations at royal Úněticean necropolis of Łęki Małe were undertaken by Józef Kostrzewski in 1931, but major archaeological discoveries at this site were made only years later in 1953 and 1955. In 1935 Kostrzewski published the first data and findings of the Iwno culture, another Bronze Age culture contemporaneous with the Únětice EBA, from Western Poland. In 1960 Wanda Sarnowska (1911–1989) began excavations in Szczepankowice near Wrocław, southwest Poland, where a new group of barrows was unearthed. In 1969 she published a new monograph on the Únětice culture in which she cataloged, analysed, and described assemblages deriving from 373 known EBA Úněticean sites in Poland.

The first unified chronological system (relative chronology) based on a typology of ceramics and metal artefacts for the Únětice culture in Bohemia was introduced by Moucha in 1963. This chronological system consisting of six sub-phases was considered valid for the Bohemian groups of the Únětice culture, and later was adapted in Poland and in Germany.

Recently, the Únětice culture has been cited as a pan-European cultural phenomenon whose influence covered large areas due to intensive exchange, with Únětice pottery and bronze artefacts found from Ireland to Scandinavia, the Italian Peninsula, and the Balkans. As such, it is candidate for a community connecting a continuum of already scattered, late Indo-European languages, ancestral to the Italo-Celtic, Germanic, and perhaps Balto–Slavic groups, between which words were frequently exchanged, and a common lexicon, as well as regional isoglosses were shared.

Chronology

The culture corresponds to Bronze A1 and A2 in the chronological schema of Paul Reinecke:
A1: 2300–1950 BC: triangular daggers, flat axes, stone wrist-guards, flint arrowheads
A2: 1950–1700 BC: daggers with metal hilt, flanged axes, halberds, pins with perforated spherical heads, solid bracelets

Sub-groups

The Únětice culture originated in the territories of contemporary Bohemia. Ten local sub-groups can be distinguished in its classical phase:
 
 Moravia Group 
 Slovakia Group; following the so-called Nitra Group
 Lower Austria Group 
 Central Germany Group 
 Lower Saxony Group 
 Lower Lusatia Group 
 Silesia Group 
 Greater Poland (Kościan) Group 
 Galicia (Western Ukraine) Group

Artefacts and characteristics

Burials

From a technical point of view, Úněticean graves can be divided in two categories: flat graves and barrows. The Únětice culture practiced skeletal inhumations, but occasionally cremation was also practised.

A typical Úněticean cemetery was situated near a settlement, usually on a hill or acclivity and in the vicinity of a creek or river. The distance between the cemetery and the adjacent settlement very rarely exceeds . Cemeteries were usually spatially organized, with symmetrical rows or alleys. Burials of the Únětice culture are orientated according to stars and the relative position of the sun on the horizon during the year, which may indicate quite advanced prehistoric astronomical observations.

Barrows–Princely graves 

To date, over fifty Úněticean barrows have been found in Central Europe; the majority of the monuments have been published in archaeological literature, but only about 60% of that number have been excavated according to modern standards. Some of the tombs found in the early 19th century such as the many tombs in Kościan County, Poland, were incorrectly identified and robbed or otherwise destroyed .
The largest concentrations of Úněticean barrows, also known in archaeological literature as "princely graves", can be found:
in Czech Republicin the vicinity of Prague, e.g. Brandýs, Březno, Mladá Boleslav–Čejetičky–Choboty, Prague 5- Řeporyje, Prague 6- Bubeneč;
 in Central Germanyin, for example, Bornhöck, Leubingen, Helmsdorf, Baalberge, Dieskau II, Sömmerda I–II and Groß Gastrose;
 in Polandin Greater Poland, e.g. Łęki Małe I–V, in Silesia: e.g. Szczepankowice Ia–Ib, Kąty Wrocławskie.
The size of the tombs varies, with the biggest of all being the monument associated with the Kościan Group of the Únětice CultureBarrow No.4 at Łęki Małe 50 metres in diameter and 5-6 metres in height today. In the classic phase, a typical "princely grave" was approximately 25 metres in diameter and 5 metres in height.

Flat graves 

A typical Úněticean flat grave was a rectangular or oval pit 1-1.9 metres long, 0.6-1.2 metres wide and 0.30-1.5 metres deep. Depending on the shape of the bottom and depth, graves can be divided into four sub-types: rectangular, concave, trapezoid, or hourglass.

One of the most prominent characteristics is the position of the body in the grave pit. The deceased were always buried in a north–south alignment, with the head south and facing east. The body was usually placed in the grave in a slightly contracted position. Exceptions from this rule are sporadic.

In the classic phase (approximately 1850–1750 BC), the Úněticean burial rite displays strong uniformity, regardless of the gender or age of the deceased. Men and women were buried in the same north–south position. The grave goods consisted of ceramic vessels (usually 1–5), bronze items (jewellery and private belongings, rings, hair clips, pins etc.), bone artefacts (amulets and tools, including needles), occasionally flint tools (the burial of Archer from Nowa Wieś Wrocławska, for example, was buried with colour flint arrowheads).
A body deposited within a grave might have been protected with mats made from plant materials or a coffin, but in the majority of cases there was no additional coverage of the corpse. A well-known example of wicker-made coffin inhumation derives from Bruszczewo fortified settlement, nearby Poznań in Greater Poland. In approximately 20% of burials, stone settings were found. Erection of a full stone setting or just a partial one (a few stones in the corners of grave) seems to be quite a common practice observed in all phases of the EBA in Central Europe. Wooden coffins were discovered at several sites such as in Lower Silesia. Únětice culture coffin burials can be divided in two types, according their construction: coffins of the stretcher type, and coffins of the canoe type. Coffins were made of single block of wood. The most prominent example of a rich cemetery containing many of such inhumations is in Przecławice nearby Wrocław. Coffin burials appear in Central Europe in the Neolithic and are well known from Bell Beaker and Corded Ware cultures in Moravia.

Metal objects

The culture is distinguished by its characteristic metal objects, including ingot torcs, flat axes, flat triangular daggers, bracelets with spiral ends, disk- and paddle-headed pins, and curl rings, which are distributed over a wide area of Central Europe and beyond.

The ingots are found in hoards that can contain over six hundred pieces. Axe-hoards are common as well: the hoard of Dieskau (Saxony) contained 293 flanged axes. Thus, axes might have served as ingots as well. After about 2000BC, this hoarding tradition dies out and is only resumed in the Urnfield period. These hoards have formerly been interpreted as a form of storage by itinerant bronze-founders or as riches hidden because of enemy action. This second interpretation is likely as even today weapons are hoarded underground to hide them from the enemy and axes were the primary weapon at that time. Hoards containing mainly jewellery are typical for the Adlerberg group.

Archaeological evidence suggests that the Únětice metal industry, though active and innovative, was concerned with producing weapons and ornaments mainly as status symbols for high-ranking individuals rather than for widespread domestic use or for equipping large fighting forces, developments which would wait until later periods in European history. But the Adlerberg cemetery of Hofheim/Taunus, Germany, contained the burial of a male who had died from an arrow-shot, the stone arrow-head still being located in his arm.

The famous Sky Disk of Nebra is associated with the Central Germany groups of the Únětice culture.

Settlements

Typical Úněticean housing structures are known from the Czech Republic and Germany. The houses were constructed of wood, with a gabled roof, rectangular in plan with an entrance on the western side. The roofs were thatched, and walls were constructed using the wattle and daub technique. 

One of the most characteristic features associated with settlements are storage pits of the Únětice type. They were located beneath the houses, and were deep and spacious, with a cylindrical or slightly conical neck, arched walls, and a relatively flat bottom. These pits often served as granaries.

The vast majority of settlements consisted of several houses congregated in the communal space of the village or hamlet. Larger fortified villages, with ramparts and wooden fortifications, have been discovered as well, in, for example Bruszczewo in Greater Poland and Radłowice in Silesia. These larger villages played a role as local political centres, possibly also market places, facilitating the flow of goods and supplies. The 'proto-urban' fortified settlement of Fidvár in Slovakia was an important centre for the exploitation of nearby gold and tin deposits. 

 

Around 2300 BC, large circular enclosures were built at Pömmelte and nearby Schönebeck in central Germany. These were important ritual sites which remained in use until c. 1900 BC. Pömmelte is described as a central place of supra-regional importance. The largest known Early Bronze Age settlement in central Europe was built next to the Pömmelte enclosure. 

Some Unetice buildings were exceptionally large, such as the Dermsdorf longhouse (44m x 11m) and Zwenkau longhouse (57m x 9m), both in central Germany. These may have been elite residences, cult buildings, meeting halls, or 'men's houses' for groups of warriors or soldiers under the command of individual rulers. The Dermsdorf longhouse was built a short distance from a settlement at Leubingen, in direct alignment with the nearby Leubingen burial mound. A large number of axes were ritually deposited together in front of the longhouse, which may have belonged to a contingent of warriors or soldiers.

Experimental reconstructions of Bronze Age longhouses have indicated that the builders must have had "a complex system of numbers and data for linear measurements" to manage such house building challenges. Construction techniques included the use of rectangular beams, planks and boards, mortice and tenon joints, scarf joints, single notched joints, slots, grooves, pivots, wooden pegs, and rebates.

Trade

The Únětice culture had trade links with the British Wessex culture. Únětice metalsmiths mainly used pure copper; alloys of copper with arsenic, antimony, and tin to produce bronze became common only in the succeeding periods. The cemetery of Singen is an exception; it contained some daggers with a high tin content (up to 9%). They may have been produced in Brittany, where a few rich graves have been found from this period. Cornish tin was widely traded as well. A gold lunula of Irish design has been found as far south as Butzbach in Hessen (Germany). Amber was also traded, but small fossil deposits may have been used as well as Baltic amber.

Analyses of Early Bronze Age rings, ribs and axe blades from across central Europe have found that they had approximately standardised weights and probably served as a form of commodity money. In the first centuries of the second millennium BC, increasing precision in exchange was achieved by the introduction of lighter ingots. Certain artefacts (e.g. ösenrings) may have also been used as a type of token-money.

At the end of the Early Bronze Age rings and ribs were replaced by scrap and raw metal in the exchange process, indicating the development of weighing scales and the use of weighed metal as a means of payment. This weighing system may have emerged independently in central Europe through the serial production of bronze artefacts with a perceptible similar weight.

In 2014 the largest known hoard of copper rib-ingots was discovered in Oberding, Germany, consisting of 796 ingots, dating from c. 1700 BC. The find is associated with the Straubing group. Most of the ingots were tied together with tree bast in bundles of ten, each individual ingot weighing approximately 100 grams on average and the bundles weighing approximately 1 kilogram each. Forty of these bundles were further grouped into bundles of ten (or 100 ingots). This indicates the use of a decimal system. The use of approximately 1 kilogram weight is also unusual as the kilogram was first introduced as a unit of measurement in 1793.

Numerous 'enigmatic tablets' (also known as Brotlaibidole in German) made from clay (and occasionally stone) have been found across central Europe and northern Italy, dating from the Early and Middle Bronze Age, including in sites associated with the Unetice Culture. The tablets are marked with sequences of geometric figures, such as circles, lines, points, crosses, etc. The function of the tablets is not clear and the meaning of the incisions has not yet been deciphered. The prevailing theory is that they served a purpose in long-distance trade, possibly of metals. 

In 2010 a major exhibition was organized on the 'enigmatic tablets' from the Archaeological Museum of Upper Mantua in Cavriana with the collaboration of thirty-five other museums. One hundred examples of enigmatic tablets were exhibited. In 2015 an international project was launched to study the tablets involving various Italian and foreign universities. The artefacts have been analysed and categorised using a three-dimensional scanning and measuring technique that allows for a precise morphological comparison to be made between tablets.

Influence of the Únětice tradition

Today, the Únětice culture is considered to be part of a wider pan-European cultural phenomenon, arising gradually between the second half of the 3rd millennium and the beginning of the 2nd. According to Pokutta, "The role of the Únětice Culture in the formation of Bronze Age Europe cannot be overrated. The rise and the existence of this original, expansive and dynamic population mark one of the most interesting moments in European prehistory." The influence of this culture covered much larger areas mainly due to intensive exchange. Únětice pottery and bronze objects are thus found in Britain, Ireland, Scandinavia, and Italy as well as the Balkans.

The strong impact of Úněticean metallurgical centres and pottery-making traditions can be seen in other EBA groups, for example, in the Adlerberg, Straubing, Singen, Neckar-Ries, and Upper-Rhine groups in Germany and Switzerland, as well as the Unterwölbling in Austria. The Nitra group, inhabiting southern Slovakia, not only precedes the Únětice culture chronologically, but is also strongly culturally related to it. All of these groups are alternatively seen as local variants of a broader Únětice culture. According to Sergent (1995) the Polada culture in northern Italy and the Rhône culture in France and Switzerland also represent southern variants of the Unetice culture. In later times, some elements of the Úněticean pottery-making traditions can be found in the Trzciniec culture as well.

Genetics

 examined the remains of 8 individuals of the Unetice culture buried in modern-day Germany c. 2200–1800 BC. The 3 samples of Y-DNA extracted belonged to Y-haplogroups I2a2, I2c2 and I2, while the 8 samples of mtDNA extracted were determined to belong to haplogroup I3a (2 samples), U5a1, W3a1, U5b2a1b, H4a1a1, H3 and V. The examined Unetice individuals were found to be very closely related to peoples of the earlier Yamnaya culture, Bell Beaker culture and Corded Ware culture. Their amount of steppe-related ancestry is comparable to that of some modern Europeans.

 examined the remains of 7 individuals of the Unetice culture buried in modern-day Poland and Czech Republic from c. 2300–1800 BC. The 7 samples of mtDNA extracted were determined to belong to haplogroup U4, U2e1f1, H6a1b, U5a1b1, K1a4a1, T2b and K1b1a. An additional male from the late Corded Ware culture or early Unetice culture in Łęki Małe, Poland of c. 2300–2000 BC was found to be a carrier of the paternal haplogroup R1b1a and the maternal haplogroup T2e. It was found that the people of the Corded Ware culture, Bell Beaker culture, Unetice culture and Nordic Bronze Age were genetically very similar to one another, and displayed a significant amount of genetic affinity with the Yamnaya culture.

Gallery

See also

 Bronze Age Britain
 Wessex culture
 Armorican Tumulus culture
 Nordic Bronze Age
 Argaric culture
 Sintashta culture
 Catacomb culture
 Abashevo culture
 Ottomány culture
 Wietenberg culture
 Polada culture
 Helladic culture
 Mycenaean Greece

References

Sources

J. M. Coles/A. F. Harding, The Bronze Age in Europe (London 1979).
 
 
 
G. Weber, Händler, Krieger, Bronzegießer (Kassel 1992).
 R. Krause, Die endneolithischen und frühbronzezeitlichen Grabfunde auf der Nordterrasse von Singen am Hohentwiel (Stuttgart 1988).
 B. Cunliffe (ed.), The Oxford illustrated prehistory of Europe (Oxford, Oxford University Press 1994).

External links

 Nebra Sky Disk official website, State Museum of Saxony-Anhalt in Halle
 What was life like in the Early Bronze Age? - German language documentary about the Unetice culture era
 Úněticean settlement Area Brno-Tuřany photo gallery 
 Gold from Leki Male barrows, Poznan Archaeological Muzeum
 Uneticean cemetery Prague East
 Greater Poland (Koscian) Group of the Unetice culture
 Henge-like sanctuary of the earliest Únětice Culture

 
Archaeological cultures of Central Europe
Bronze Age cultures of Europe
Indo-European archaeological cultures
Archaeological cultures in Austria
Archaeological cultures in the Czech Republic
Archaeological cultures in Germany
Archaeological cultures in Poland
Archaeological cultures in Slovakia